Amanolah Papi (born 3 April 1990) is an Iranian Paralympic athlete specializing in javelin throw. He represented Iran at the 2020 Summer Paralympics.

Career
Papi represented Iran in the men's javelin throw F57 event at the 2020 Summer Paralympics and won a silver medal.

References 

1990 births
Living people
People from Khorramabad
Medalists at the World Para Athletics Championships
Iranian male javelin throwers
Paralympic athletes of Iran
Medalists at the 2020 Summer Paralympics
Athletes (track and field) at the 2020 Summer Paralympics
Paralympic silver medalists for Iran
Paralympic medalists in athletics (track and field)
21st-century Iranian people